Brayan Emanuel Vera Ramírez (born 15 January 1999) is a Colombian footballer who plays as a defender for Real Salt Lake.

Career 
He grew up in the Itagui Leones.

On 13 June 2019 he left the club by moving to Italian side Lecce. He finished his first Serie A season with 8 appearances, 1 of them as a starter.

On 5 October 2020 he joined Serie B club Cosenza on loan. 

On 4 March 2022, Vera moved on loan to América de Cali until the end of 2022. On 19 December 2022, América de Cali announced that the transfer will be made permanent for the 2023 season.

On 13 February 2023, Vera signed with Major League Soccer side Real Salt Lake on a three-year deal.

Personal life 
On 26 August 2020 he tested positive for COVID-19.

References

1999 births
Sportspeople from Antioquia Department
Living people
Colombian footballers
Association football forwards
Colombia under-20 international footballers
Leones F.C. footballers
U.S. Lecce players
Cosenza Calcio players
Real Salt Lake players
América de Cali footballers
Categoría Primera A players
Serie A players
Serie B players
Colombian expatriate footballers
Expatriate footballers in Italy
Colombian expatriate sportspeople in Italy